is a metropolitan park in Tokyo, having entrances in Koganei City, Kodaira City, Nishitokyo City, and Musashino City.

Overview
The fifth-largest park in the Metropolitan Tokyo Area, Koganei Park is an attraction for local residents and tourists. The numerous varieties of plum trees in the park bloom in March, and the Cherry trees in April, providing a desirable setting for exercise enthusiasts, photographers, picnickers, and nature lovers.

The park's Edo-Tokyo Open Air Architectural Museum, which opened in March 1993, features buildings characteristic to different historical periods and those built by famous Japanese architects. The buildings were moved from their original locations and arranged at the museum site to mimic the set up of a village.

Key Features

Cherry Tree Garden
Plum Tree Forest
Edo-Tokyo Open Air Architectural Museum
Sports Complex
Cycling Course
Bird Sanctuary
Archery Range
Source of Shakujii River

See also

Tokyo Metropolitan Park Association

Parks and gardens in Tokyo
Protected areas established in 1954